Isoetes heldreichii, or Pindus quillwort, is a species of lycopod. It is critically endangered. Some think it extinct as it was last seen in 1885.

Distribution 
It is found in Central Greece.

Taxonomy 
It was described by Richard Wettstein in 1886.

References 

heldreichii
Endemic flora of Greece
Critically endangered plants
Taxa named by Richard Wettstein